Mick Crocker may refer to:

Michael Crocker, Australian rugby league footballer of the 2000s
Harold "Mick" Crocker, Australian rugby league footballer of the 1950s